Robert Christie Jr. (March 10, 1824 Troy, Rensselaer County, New York – February 15, 1875) was an American lawyer and politician from New York.

Life
He studied law with David L. Seymour and David Buel Jr., was admitted to the bar, and practiced in Troy in partnership with Buel. About 1847, Christie removed to New York City. In 1851, he married Frances Juliet Kelsey, and they had several children.

He was a member of the New York State Assembly (Richmond Co.) in 1859; and a member of the New York State Senate (1st D.) in 1864 and 1865.

In June 1874, Christie suffered a severe stroke, and also became ill with diphtheria. He died eight months later at his home in Clifton, Staten Island, following a bout of pneumonia.

References

Sources
 The New York Civil List compiled by Franklin Benjamin Hough, Stephen C. Hutchins and Edgar Albert Werner (1870; pg. 443 and 490)
 Biographical Sketches of the State Officers and Members of the Legislature of the State of New York in 1859 by William D. Murphy (pg. 145)

1824 births
Democratic Party New York (state) state senators
Politicians from Troy, New York
Democratic Party members of the New York State Assembly
People from Staten Island
1875 deaths
19th-century American politicians